The 155th Street station (155th Street–Eighth Avenue on some signage) is a local station on the IND Concourse Line of the New York City Subway. It is located at the intersection of the bi-level 155th Street's lower level and Frederick Douglass Boulevard, at the border of Harlem and the Coogan's Bluff section of Washington Heights neighborhoods of Manhattan. It is served by the D train at all times except rush hours in the peak direction and the B during rush hours only. The station opened in 1933, along with the rest of the Concourse Line.

History 
This station was built as part of the IND Concourse Line, which was one of the original lines of the city-owned Independent Subway System (IND). The route of the Concourse Line was approved to Bedford Park Boulevard on June 12, 1925 by the New York City Board of Transportation. Construction of the line began in July 1928. The station opened on July 1, 1933, along with the rest of the Concourse subway.

Station layout

This underground station has two side platforms and three tracks. The center track is used by the D express train during rush hours in the peak direction.

Both platforms have an orange trim line with a black border and mosaic name tablets reading "155TH ST. – 8TH AVE." in white sans-serif lettering on a black background with orange border. Small "155" and directional tile captions in white lettering on a black background run below the trim line and some of the mosaic name tablets. Orange-yellow I-beam columns run along both platforms at regular intervals, with alternating ones having the standard black name plate in white lettering.

The street staircase is wider than normal staircases, since the Polo Grounds stadium, home of the former New York Giants, was situated near the station, before the team left for San Francisco in 1958. The stadium was demolished in 1964 to make way for public housing after the New York Mets played there in 1962 and 1963. Today, Rucker Park is located at the entrance of the station.

An abandoned tower sits on the south end of the Brooklyn-bound platform. When the IRT Ninth Avenue Line and later the Polo Grounds Shuttle were in service, there was a provision for transfer tickets between the IND underground level and the IRT elevated shuttle level. A very steep walk was needed to make this transfer.

This is the only station in Manhattan that is served solely by the IND Concourse Line. To the north, the line continues under the Harlem River towards 161st Street–Yankee Stadium in the Bronx. To the south, the line continues under Saint Nicholas Place to a transfer station with the IND Eighth Avenue Line at 145th Street. South of 145th Street, the IND Concourse Line merges with the IND Eighth Avenue Line.

Exit
This station has a full length mezzanine above the platforms. However, only the northern end is open and has six staircases to the platforms. The Brooklyn-bound platform has four closed staircases while the Bronx-bound one has five. The mezzanine has yellow I-beam columns. The fare control area at the north end has a turnstile bank, token booth, one exit-only turnstile on each side of the mezzanine, and a quadruple-wide staircase diagonal to the mezzanine that goes up to the west side of Frederick Douglass Boulevard between 155th Street and Harlem River Drive.

References

External links 

 
 Station Reporter — B Train
 Station Reporter — D Train
 The Subway Nut — 155th Street – 8th Avenue Pictures 
 Eighth Avenue entrance from Google Maps Street View
Platforms from Google Maps Street View

IND Concourse Line stations
New York City Subway stations in Manhattan
Railway stations in the United States opened in 1933
1933 establishments in New York City
Hamilton Heights, Manhattan
Washington Heights, Manhattan